The Socialist Alliance was a left-wing electoral alliance in England between 1999 and 2005.

Origins
The Socialist Alliance grew out of local alliances formed by the Socialist Party, Independent Labour Network and independent socialists from 1992 onward. They gradually coalesced into a national Network of Socialist Alliances. The Welsh Socialist Alliance was closely allied, but had separate origins.

The Socialist Alliance was named and expanded in 1999 when other Trotskyist groups including the  Alliance for Workers' Liberty, Socialist Workers Party, International Socialist Group and Workers Power joined, as did the formerly separate London Socialist Alliance. In the 2002 local elections, the alliance gained one councillor in Preston, Lancashire. The Socialist Alliance had fraternal relations with the Scottish Socialist Party.

Contraction and dissolution
In late 2001, the Network of Socialist Alliances was transformed into a one-member-one-vote political party called the Socialist Alliance (a title already registered for electoral purposes).

The Socialist Alliance was riven by political disagreements. The Socialist Party left the Alliance in 2001 (after the conference that adopted one member one vote) while Workers Power left in 2003.

In 2003, the SWP, supported by the ISG, led the SA into an alliance with George Galloway and other figures involved in the Stop the War Coalition, to form the Respect Coalition. A minority of the SA objected to the way this decision was carried out and argued that the SWP were using their block vote to push their line. Many of these dissidents objected to Respect on principle and all objected to the way the decision to join it was carried out, many forming the Socialist Alliance Democracy Platform.

In late 2004, some Socialist Alliance member organisations, which had remained outside Respect, joined with the Socialist Party and the Alliance for Green Socialism to establish the Socialist Green Unity Coalition.

As the SWP switched its priorities to working within Respect, the Socialist Alliance became virtually moribund and was formally wound up in February 2005.

In March 2005, a few groups and former members of the SA who did not join Respect met as the Socialist Alliance (Provisional). On 12 November 2005, most of the provisional grouping (independent members, and members of the Alliance for Workers' Liberty, Alliance for Green Socialism, the Communist Party of Great Britain (Provisional Central Committee), the Democratic Socialist Alliance, the Republican Communist Network (Scotland), the Revolutionary Democratic Group, the Socialist Unity Network, the United Socialist Party, and the Democratic Labour Party met again and claimed the name of the Socialist Alliance for a re-founded political organisation, registered with the Electoral Commission. In 2007, this small group entered into a mutual affiliation with its largest supporting organisation, the Alliance for Green Socialism.

List of supporting organisations
 Alliance for Workers' Liberty
 Communist Party of Great Britain (Provisional Central Committee)
 Democratic Labour Party
 Independent Labour Network (disbanded before 2003)
 International Socialist Group
 International Socialist League
 Lewisham Independent Socialists
 Red Action (left 2001)
 Revolutionary Democratic Group
 Socialist Party (left 2001)
 Socialist Perspectives
 Socialist Resistance
 Socialist Solidarity Network
 Socialist Workers Party
 Workers International
 Workers Power (left 2003)

References

External links
 Socialist Alliance (current site)
 Socialist Alliance (2005)
 Old site of Socialist Alliance Democracy Platform
 Democratic Socialist Alliance (formerly the Socialist Alliance Democracy Platform)
 People Before Profit SA 2001 Election Platform 1.6MB PDF
 2001 Official UK Electoral Commission Report on the 2001 General Election
 Socialist Unity Network
 Set of documents relating to the Socialist Alliance hosted by the Socialist Party of England and Wales.

Political parties established in 1999
Political parties disestablished in 2005
Socialist parties in England
Defunct political party alliances in the United Kingdom
1999 establishments in England
2005 disestablishments in England